Mohammed Ahmad Sultan Ben Sulayem (born 12 November 1961) is an Emirati former rally driver and current president of the FIA (Fédération Internationale de l'Automobile).

He is one of the Arab world's leading motor sport figures.  As President of the Automobile & Touring Club of the United Arab Emirates since 2006 he is a patron of a wide range of charities and ambassador for road safety in the UAE; supports motor sport officials' and young drivers' education, training and research to promote motor sport safety; co-edited an academic book on sports management; supporter of classic vehicle movement and automotive heritage.

In 2008, he became the first Arab named as Vice President of the FIA, and the first to be elected to the FIA World Motor Sport Council. As the Vice-President he has pioneered teaching, research and knowledge transfer initiatives in motor sport. In 2009, during a promotional event for Renault's F1 team, Ben Sulayem crashed a Renault R28 Formula One car in a race against a Ford GT. He was a key person in the formation and running of the Abu Dhabi Grand Prix in 2009. In June 2013, he was appointed as chairman of the new Motor Sport Development Task Force set up by the FIA to build a ten-year plan for the sport's global development. In December 2021, he was appointed the FIA President.

Education
Sulayem studied business at the American University in Washington D.C., and at the University of Ulster where he got a bachelor.

In July 2012, was awarded the honorary degree of Doctor of Science from the University of Ulster, in recognition of his services to sport, civic leadership and charity.

Car collection 
Sulayem is a prominent car collector in the UAE, known for his extravagant taste in hypercars. Sulayem's collection includes the following:

 Koenigsegg Agera RS in blue carbon
 Koenigsegg Regera in burgundy carbon with gold wheels
 Mercedes-Benz CLK GTR Super Sport (1 of 5)
 Mercedes-Benz CLK GTR Roadster (chassis #6 of 6 built)
 Ferrari F40
 Ferrari F50
 Ferrari Enzo
 Ferrari LaFerrari
 Porsche 911 GT1 Straßenversion
 Porsche Carrera GT
 Porsche 918 Spyder
 McLaren P1
 McLaren Senna
 McLaren Speedtail (x2)
 Pagani Huayra BC
 Bugatti EB 110 SS
 Bugatti Veyron 16.4 Super Sport
 Bugatti Chiron
 Jaguar XJ220
 Lexus LFA
 2005 Ford GT
 2017 Ford GT
 Multiple Rolls-Royce Motor Cars, including Phantom and Cullinan.

FIA role

In 2008, Sulayem was appointed Vice President of the FIA and a member of the World Motor Sport Council.

The FIA is the global sporting authority for motorsport and represents 100 million car owners in almost 200 countries. The World Motor Sport Council meets at least four times a year to decide on rules, regulations, safety and development of motor sport at every level, from karting to Formula One.

Headed by the FIA President, its membership is chosen by the FIA General Assembly, which contains representatives from national automobile clubs throughout the world.

In his FIA role, Sulayem has pioneered teaching, research and knowledge transfer initiatives in the UAE and elsewhere throughout the world.

In June 2013 he was named as chairman of the FIA's Motor Sport Development Task Force, with the responsibility to devise a strategic plan to develop and grow motorsport in a sustainable manner over the next ten years. It will be the first such plan in the 109-year history of the FIA, and Sulayem immediately started a consultation process with motor sport stakeholders, including manufacturers, the media, promoters, fans and FIA member clubs around the world. He will brief the World Motorsport Council on progress at its September meeting in Croatia, when the other members of the task force will be nominated. He will present the ten-year plan to the FIA General Assembly for approval at the end of 2014.

Sulayem is a founding member of the Arab Council of Touring and Automobile Clubs, which aims to unite the FIA Clubs of Arabic-speaking territories.

In December 2021, Sulayem was elected president of the FIA, succeeding Jean Todt.

In January 2023, Sulayem was embroiled in a sexism scandal after The Times newspaper resurfaced comments he made on his now archived website in 2001. The newspaper quoted Sulayem as saying he did not like "women who think they are smarter than men, for they are not in truth". The veracity of the quotes was not refuted by Sulayem, but the FIA defended him saying "the remarks in this archived website from 2001 do not reflect the president's beliefs".

Personal life 
On 7 March 2023, Ben Sulayem's son, Saif Ben Sulayem, was killed in a road accident in Dubai.

References

External links

Mohammed Ben Sulayem
Ben Sulayem Performance

1961 births
Living people
Emirati rally drivers
Sportspeople from Dubai
Middle East Rally Championship
Fédération Internationale de l'Automobile presidents